Macromitrium is a genus of mosses belonging to the family Orthotrichaceae.

The species of this genus are found predominantly in Southern Hemisphere.

Species:
 Macromitrium acuminatum (Reinw. & Hornsch.) Müll.Hal. 
 Macromitrium acuminatum C.Müller, 1845

References

Orthotrichales
Moss genera